Edward August Werner (born February 9, 1882) was an American football coach and athletics administrator. He served as the head football coach at Otterbein University in Westerville, Ohio from 1907 to 1908 and Trinity University in Waxahachie, Texas from 1909 to 1910 and again in 1914, compiling a career college football coaching record of 18–20–5.

Head coaching record

College

References

1882 births
Year of death missing
Otterbein Cardinals athletic directors
Otterbein Cardinals football coaches
Springfield Pride football players
Trinity Tigers athletic directors
Trinity Tigers football coaches
High school football coaches in Wisconsin
People from Washington County, Kansas